Water SA publishes refereed, original work in all branches of water science, technology and engineering. This includes water resources development; the hydrological cycle; surface hydrology; geohydrology and hydrometeorology; limnology; salinisation; treatment and management of municipal and industrial water and wastewater; treatment and disposal of sewage sludge; environmental pollution control; water quality and treatment; aquaculture in terms of its impact on the water resource; agricultural water science; etc.

References

Publications established in 1975
Hydrology journals